Chris Given-Wilson (born 1949) is a British historian and academic, specialising in medieval history. He was Professor of History of the University of St Andrews, where he is now professor emeritus. He is the author of a number of books.

Career 

He has been described as one of the leading authorities on medieval English historical writing and expert on medieval writers such as William of Malmesbury and Adam of Usk.

He is currently Emeritus Professor of History at the University of St. Andrews, Scotland.

Many of his books, published by Boydell & Brewer, have become bestsellers.

Bibliography 

His notable books include:

 Edward II: The Terrors of Kingship
 The Royal Bastards of Medieval England
 Chronicles: The Writing of History in Medieval England
 The English Nobility in the Late Middle Ages
 Chronicles of the Revolution, 1397-1400: The Reign of Richard II
 The Royal Household and the King's Affinity: Service, Politics, and Finance in England, 1360-1413
 The Parliament Rolls of Medieval England, 1275-1504: Rotuli Parliamentorum

References 

Year of birth unknown
Living people
British historians
British male writers
Year of birth missing (living people)